The Territorial Abbacy of Santa Maria of Grottaferrata is an ecclesiastical jurisdiction which administers the Abbey of Saint Mary in Grottaferrata located in Grottaferrata, Rome, Lazio, Italy. The Abbacy and its territory are stauropegic, that is, directly subordinate to a primate or synod, rather than to a local bishop. It is the only remnant of the once-flourishing Italo-Greek monastic tradition. It is the only monastery of the Italian Basilian Order of Grottaferrata, (abbreviated  O.S.B.I.), a religious order of the Italo-Albanian Catholic Church. The abbot ordinary is also the superior general of the Italian Basilian Order of Grottaferrata. Though normally led by an abbot, the Abbacy has been under the authority of Bishop Marcello Semeraro since Pope Francis named him Apostolic Administrator of the Abbacy on 4 November 2013.

The abbey was founded in 1004 by St. Nilus of Rossano, a monk of Byzantine descent from Calabria. It has remained in continuous operation since then. It is the only one of the Italo-Greek-Byzantine monasteries that has survived. Most of them gradually fell into decadence and were seized by the Kingdom of Italy when it secularized religious orders in 1866. Only the Grottaferrata monastery, considered a national monument, was allowed to continue with the monks as its guardians. In the course of time, the civil authorities have allowed them increasing independence.

On 1 November 1571, the Italian Basilian Order of Grottaferrata was established.

In the 1880s, the Holy See in anticipation of rapprochement with the Orthodox churches, ordered the liturgy of the monastery to be purged of the Latin elements that had been introduced over the centuries. Vocations were no longer sought from the Italian people of Latin rite, but instead chiefly among the Italo-Albanians of Greek rite, and the monks set up new monasteries in Sicily and Calabria. These monks, in the wake of the Eastern Christian faith, kept the Byzantine rite alive, suppressing the danger in the now secular ritual collapse. The Italo-Albanian monks replaced the old Latin and Latinizing guard which had taken up ample space in Grottaferrata, contributing to the rebirth of the Abbey and becoming notable palaeographers, liturgists and musicologists, as well as among the main albanologists and byzantinists of the period.

These same monks were promoters of a careful ecumenism between the Church of the West and the Church of the East, with missions of peace and evangelization of territories in the Balkans that had passed to Islam during the Turkish domination, in particular in Albania. The effects of this mission, generally welcomed in a positive way by the Albanians, had quickly created a close religious and cultural bridge between the Albanian communities of Italy and Albania, with the rebirth of the Albanian Greek-Catholic Church and the ordination of various priests. Among these stood out the martyr and saint of Albania, who loved the arbëreshë communities, Papàs Josif Papamihalli (1912-1948), witness and apostle of the Eastern Christian faith, persecuted, arrested, sentenced to forced labor and killed during the communist dictatorship of Albania.

On 26 September 1937, the abbey was made a territorial abbacy.

The Territorial Abbey also operates a rectory church in central Rome, Saint Basil at the Sallust Gardens. Abbot Apolemone Agreste, whose coat of arms appears on the arches within, had a church dedicated to Saint Basil built on St. Basil Street in Rome, not far from the Piazza Grimana, now the Piazza Barberini. Attached to it was a hospice. The monks of the Order of St. Basil had it restored in 1682, as an inscription on the doorway testifies.

See also
Arbëreshë people
Byzantine Rite
Eastern Catholic Churches
Italo-Albanian Catholic Church

References

Territorial abbeys